"Heaven (Must Be There)" (sometimes shortened to just "Heaven") is a song by the Australian pop and New Wave band Eurogliders from their album This Island. The song was released on 7" and 12" vinyl in May 1984.

The single brought the band to fame, especially in Australia, where it peaked at No. 2 on Kent Music Report Singles Chart and became one of the Top 20 biggest-selling singles of 1984.

At the 1984 Countdown Music Awards the song won Best Australian Single.

Track listing
 "Heaven (Must Be There)
 "Heliograph"
 "No Action" (Dance Mix) (12" only)

Chart performance

Weekly charts

Year-end charts

References 

1984 singles
Eurogliders songs
1984 songs
CBS Records singles